Alburquerque is a town in the province of Badajoz in Spain. It has 5,600 inhabitants.  It is very close to the border with Portugal and was an ancient dominion of the kings of that country. The origin of the name of the town is uncertain. It is believed to stem from Latin  "the white oak".

The titles of Lord of Alburquerque (de Meneses) and later Count of Alburquerque (de Castilla) and Duke of Alburquerque (de La Cueva) were important in Castile in the Middle Ages, see e.g. Sancho Alfonso, 1st Count of Alburquerque.

Its sister city of Albuquerque in the United States takes its name from this town (but note the spelling difference: the lack of the 'r' after the first 'u').

History 

By 1530, the town had a population of 6,042, increasing up to 6,893 by the end of the century (1591) and to 7,600 in 1631.

References
Citations

Bibliography
 

Municipalities in the Province of Badajoz